Perigeo are an Italian progressive rock group that released a group of albums for RCA Italiana in the 1970s.  Several of the members went on to have long careers in jazz.

The group had subsequent editions under the names New Perigeo and Perigeo Special.

Members

Perigeo
Giovanni Tommaso (bass)
Franco D'Andrea (keyboards)
Bruno Biriaco (drums and percussion) 
Claudio Fasoli (saxophones)
Tony Sidney (guitar)

New Perigeo
Giovanni Tommaso (bass)
Danilo Rea 
Agostino Marangolo 
Maurizio Giammarco (saxophone)
Carlo Pennisi

Discography

Perigeo
 1972 Azimut
 1973 Abbiamo tutti un blues da piangere
 1974 Genealogia
 1975 La valle dei templi
 1975 Live at Montreaux (Live)
 1976 Non è poi così lontano
 1976 Live in Italy 1976 (Live)
 1977 Attraverso il Perigeo (Raccolta)
 1977 Fata Morgana (LP, Album) (RCA Victor)

Perigeo Special
 1980 Alice

New Perigeo
 1981 Q Concert (EP)
 1981 Effetto amore

References

Italian progressive rock groups
Jazz fusion ensembles
RCA Records artists
Italian jazz musicians
Italian jazz ensembles